Makai (born 27 August 1973, stylized as MAKAI) is a Japanese house DJ. He is well known for his collaborations with Japanese vocalists, such as "Garden of Love" with Thelma Aoyama, which topped the iTunes Japan internal charts.

Discography

Studio albums

Other albums

External links
Official Website
Universal label site
Former BMG Japan label site
Makai's official blog

1979 births
Japanese dance musicians
Japanese DJs
Japanese house musicians
Living people
Musicians from Fukuoka Prefecture
People from Fukuoka Prefecture
Electronic dance music DJs